Cookie Run: Kingdom is an action role-playing gacha game by Devsisters and the sixth game in the Cookie Run series.

Gameplay 
Cookie Run: Kingdom is an RPG & city-building battle simulator. The game is mainly played by building the player's Cookie Kingdom and collecting Cookies using the game's gacha to fight in various game modes.

At the beginning of the game, players receive a piece of land to build structures and amenities and aid the player in collecting resources. To unlock more items/resources, the player must level up the Cookie Castle, production buildings, and the Fountain of Abundance. Furthermore, players will have to build additional structures to use for either trading or upgrading. Players can produce resources for their Kingdom with various production buildings. The Cookie Castle can be upgraded when given enough items or cleared certain tasks, and this allows the player to expand the space available, and level up buildings and place more of them. The same applies to the offline reward-giving Fountain of Abundance. The player can also expand their land by using materials or fighting enemies in certain areas with their team.

There are 98 playable Cookies in the game (Special Cookies like Sonic,Tails and the BTS Cookies are not obtainable for now), used as the main fighting units for the game's various game modes. These Cookies, can be obtained from the game's gacha, which can be activated by spending Crystals, or specific event tokens for a specific Cookie. Crystals are earned through various methods in the game or can be purchased with real-life money. Cookies are placed in teams of up to five by the player. There are 7 rarities of cookie, ranging from Common to Ancient, and 8 classes of cookie that serve different functions in battle. For example, Support cookies provide a mix of healing, damage and temporary buffs for allies, and Magic cookies can debuff enemies. All cookies have a skill that can be activated, which causes damage, healing, or other effects. These skills have a short cooldown before being able to be used again.

Cookies can be powered up by various means. General stats, which are HP, Attack, and Defense, are upgraded by leveling up the characters, primarily done through EXP Candies. EXP Jellies are obtained from playing through the game's multiple modes, or through Cookie Houses that give EXP Jellies over time. The power of a skill can be increased with Skill Powders, which are obtained through daily bounties that give a specific type of Skill Powder. Toppings can be put on a cookie to improve other stats, such as how long it takes for a skill to cool down, or how much a cookie will be affected by a debuff. Up to 5 can be equipped, and have to be upgraded using coins and topping pieces. Some cookies can be given items called Magic Candies that power up and give new effects to their skill. Magic Candies require a specific type of Crystal and Resonant Ingredient to upgrade. Cookies are obtained through soulstones, and obtaining a certain amount of soulstones for a cookie if you already have it will give you a chance to promote it up to 5 stars, which greatly increase HP,  Attack, and Defense. After a cookie has reached 5 stars they can be upgraded further through Ascension, which requires Soulcores (a version of Soulstones that is unlocked after promoting a cookie to 5 stars) and Soul Essences.

The main story mode, known as World Exploration, contains multiple levels that are played in order. Each level is played by using a team of Cookies to attack multiple enemies, and on some levels, making their cookies jump to collect coins, similar to previous Cookie Run games. Over time, other modes are added that function in a similar way but with different approaches (see Features section)

Story

In a world populated with anthropomorphised dessert items (created by witches using cookie batter and Life Powder), 5 Ancient Cookies, Pure Vanilla, White Lily, Hollyberry, Dark Cacao, and Golden Cheese, created their own kingdoms and were given Soul Jams, which granted them special powers and Immortality. One day, a certain cookie wanted to know about the origin and creation of cookies, and tried to contact the witches to seek an answer. Upon learning the horrible truth that cookies were meant to be eaten, that Cookie falls into the ultimate dough and is rebaked as Dark Enchantress Cookie, who plans to use Cake Monsters to create a new world order. Pure Vanilla was forced to seal Dark Enchantress Cookie away and have the Ancient Cookies fall under hiding, leaving their kingdoms in disarray.

Features

Cookies
The cookies can be categorized into several levels: 
 "Common" is the lowest grade when compared to other grades. It has the lowest HP or attack power, but  have the highest probability of being obtained from the Gacha.
 "Rare" is a Cookie that has improved stats in various aspects such as more HP or increased ATK.
 "Epic" Cookies are rarer compared to Common and Rare Cookies, but they have higher stats and more complex skills.
 "Super Epic" Cookies are strong cookies given through events that do not fall under the Ancient or Legendary status.
 "Legendary" is a Cookie based on the game Cookie Run: OvenBreak which has skills stronger then those of Epic Cookies, and have a very low drop rate.
 "Ancient" is a type of Cookie with skills comparable to Legendary Cookies, but are used to describe the 5 Ancient Cookies in the story.
 "Special" is a Cookie that comes from a special event. It can only be found at the specified time, but skills and stats are numerically equivalent to Epic Cookies. The first Special cookies were Sonic Cookie & Tails Cookie in celebration of the former's 30th anniversary. In addition to this are all 7 members of BTS as cookies, as part of the BTS Crossover update. 
 "Guest" is a type of Cookie that exists as decoration. It can be placed in the Kingdom and can interact with decor, but it cannot be leveled up or used in combat. These were introduced in the Disney Crossover update.
Cookies have a bond where collecting all the Cookies of a set and promoting them to a certain rank will grant stat increases to all Cookies. In addition to rarities, there are 8 types of Cookies that perform different functions in battle. A strategy can be formed by putting specific cookies in a team as their skills work together to deal more damage overall:

 Ambush Cookies have skills that target a specific enemy or row of enemies and dodge any attacks at the same time.
 Charge Cookies primarily deal damage to enemies directly in front of them.
 Defense Cookies sacrifice high damage rates in favor of giving buffs to other Cookies and having a strong Health and Defense stat.
 Magic Cookies have skills that give enemies temporary debuffs that make them weaker.
 Bomber Cookies can deal with crowds by having attacks and skills that hit multiple enemies at once.
 Ranged Cookies deal high damage to enemies, but are usually positioned in the back as to prevent them from taking damage.
 Healing Cookies have skills that heal and buff most or all of the cookies that are in the field. The strength of healing depends on the Cookie's attack power.
 Support Cookies provide a mix of damage, healing, and inflicting buffs and debuffs to allies and enemies. Support Cookies are best used to boost the power of a certain team.

Treasures
There are 4 types of treasures: Common, Rare, Epic, and Special. They also can be divided into 2 types of use of properties: Passive and Active. Active must be activated on the treasure before it can be utilized (e.g. Pilgrim's Slingshot reduces the defense of an enemy for a few seconds), whereas Passive treasures have an effect that lasts throughout the stage (e.g. Old Pilgrim's Scroll increases attack for all cookies in the field)

Modes 
In addition to the standard World Exploration mode, there are other modes unlocked throughout the game. When a certain threshold is passed in a mode, you can obtain rewards or unlock a cutscene as part of a side story. The stories that accompany the game modes are canonical to the main story.

 Bounties are the primary way of obtaining Skill Powders. Players pick a certain bounty at a certain level and must face a boss at the end, with higher levels granting more and higher quality Skill Powders, alongside crystals needed for upgrading Magic Candies.
 Dark Mode is a harder version of the standard World Exploration Mode. All enemies are stronger, the rewards are more abundant and some levels have a chance to contain soulstones for cookies.
 Master Mode is an even harder version of the World Exploration stages that place an emphasis on strategy. Multiple limitations are put on the cookies, such as restricting them to a low level and reducing any benefits given through Kingdom Affairs.
 The Tower of Sweet Chaos is a mode where a team of Cookies must fight strong enemies in levels called trays for rewards. Trays require the player to not bring specific Cookies to battle, and require Searing keys to access.
 Tropical Soda Islands has the player unlock unexplored areas on a map, which either contain a chest containing rewards, or islands filled with enemies that the player must win. These levels are longer than usual, and if a cookie falls in battle, they must dry off for a period of time before being used again. Every 8 hours a ship will arrive at the Kingdom that contains rewards, and those rewards are based on how many islands are cleared on the map. Exploring an area requires Caramel Spyglasses and Map Fragments, which are primarily obtained through clearing the islands.
 Kingdom Arena is a mode where the player's team of Cookies fight other teams set up by players around the world and vice versa. Winning a match gives the player Trophies and Medals. Trophies increase the player's rank on the leaderboard (from Chocolate 3 to Grandmaster 1) and Medals can be used to buy items like Soulstones and toppings. At the end of a season, the player is given crystals and medals based on their rank in the season.
 Super Mayhem is a seasonal gamemode, only appearing every few months. In it, 3 teams of cookies fight each other, and who wins is based on a who knocks out 2 teams first.
 Cookie Alliance is a gauntlet of strong enemies that 5 teams of Cookies must tackle. Enemies are split up into waves, and the more waves are tackled the better the rewards are when all the Cookies fall. This is the primary way of obtaining Guild Relics.
 Cookie Odyssey is a story-focused game mode unlocked after completing Episode 12 of the Story, revolving around the Soul Jam, special items that gave the ancient heroes their powers. To advance the story, players must obtain Odyssey Quills from completing certain missions.

Kingdom Affairs 
The Cookie Kingdom has multiple tasks that give the player items to progress the development of either the kingdom or the cookie's strength. These are represented by areas in the Kingdom;

 The Cookie Castle is the main landmark of the kingdom, and the first the player unlocks. Upgrading the Castle requires tasks like leveling up cookies and buildings, and it is required in order to unlock more buildings and increase the max level of existing buildings, allowing the creation of new goods.
 The Fountain of Abundance is one of the earliest features the player unlocks, where free rewards, such as coins, EXP Candies, Crystals, Materials, and other items are accumulated over time for the player to collect. Upgrading the fountain increases the amount of rewards that can be obtained.
 The Bear Jelly Train allows the player to obtain rarities required for upgrading buildings. Goods and Materials are sent to a train, and waiting a certain time will have the train return with rarities.
 The Tree of Wishes is a quick way of obtaining coins. By "fufilling" a Cookie's wish by giving them Materials and Goods, the player obtains a sum of coins greater than directly selling those items.
 The Sugar Gnome Laboratory allows the player to get permanent boosts, such as reduced production time for a certain building or decreasing the amount of Stamina Jellies needed to play a level.
 The Hall of Ancient Heroes allows any Cookie above Level 30 to be boosted to the Level of the 5th strongest Cookie in the player's collection. Slots to boost more Cookies require Radiant Shards to unlock, and removing a Cookie from a slot will require 5 days before another Cookie can be placed in that slot.
 The Statue of Heroic Radiance boosts many stats for the cookies and the Kingdom and needs Radiant Shards and Rarities to upgrade.
 The Trade Harbor is the other major method of obtaining items needed for the Tropical Soda Islands.. Sending materials or goods to ships will allow them to return with Rainbow Pearls, which can be spent on Soulstones, Rarities, Map Fragments, Caramel Spyglasses, and other items. In addition, the Seaside Market can be accessed, allowing players to trade goods for items of a similar value.
 The Balloon Dock is the primary method of obtaining Toppings and Topping Pieces. A team of 3-5 Cookies are sent on an exploration of a completed Episode of the Story Mode, and the Episode picked influences the quantity and rarity of toppings that can be obtained.
 Landmarks are special buildings that give stat boosts to various things, such as increasing health, reducing the production time for items, or increasing the amount of coins obtained in a level. Some Landmarks give the player items like Soulstones or Rarities. The Sky Garden allows the player to store landmarks without removing their benefits.

Updates 
For the developer's history, see here: Devsisters/History

 February 5, 2021: Version 1.1 is released. Features Dark Mode (the harder version of Story Mode & focuses on Dark Enchantress Cookie's group), first update-added cookie Kumiho Cookie & first update-added Treasure (Sacred Pomegranate Branch)
 March 5, 2021: Beacons of Unity, aka. Version 1.2, is released. Features Guild Battles, a new Storyline, the treasure Bookseller's Monocle, 2 Epics (Latte & Cream Puff Cookie (the latter's a Guild Gacha exclusive)), & a mid-update (March 18) with Almond Cookie.
 April 8, 2021: The Lost Kingdom, aka. Version 1.3, is released. Features 2 new Episodes that tell the story of Vanilla Kingdom, update special Nether Gacha for Legendary/Ancient Cookies, 2 new Cookies (Black Raisin & Pure Vanilla, the latter being an Ancient) & the mid update (April 22) featuring Stage 9 end boss, Strawberry Crepe Cookie. This ends the First Cookie Legion.
 May 13 - 28, 2021: The Tower of Sweet Chaos, aka Version 1.4-5. Features 4 new cookies on both versions (Pastry, Fig, Red Velvet, Devil), a new game mode featuring 150 challenges, 3 new treasures & a research mode that buffs up production/cookie's abilities.
 June 21 & July 15, 2021: Tropical Soda Islands, aka Versions 1.6-7. Features 3 cookies (Mango, Lilac & Sea Fairy), a new trading system & a new game mode.
 August 3 - 17, 2021: Soda Island Outlaws, aka. Versions 1.8-9. Features 3 more new cookies (Sorbet Shark, Squid Ink & Parfait), a new treasure, an update-exclusive game mode (Tropical Raids), the continuation of the Tropical Soda Islands story & the first English-voiced cookie.
 September 2 - 17, 2021: Heart of Courage & Passion, aka. Versions 2.0 - 2.1. Features 3 new cookies (Raspberry, Moon Rabbit, & Hollyberry), 2 new Episodes telling the story of Hollyberry Palace, the Japanese voice-pack, & on the mid-update, a crossover event featuring an exclusive game mode, guest characters from the Sonic the Hedgehog series, & a new level of rarity, Special.
October 2, 2021: Interdimensional Super Mayhem, aka. Version 2.2. Features a new storyline, the extended Arena mode, 2 new cookies (Mala Sauce & Twizzly Gummy), & the English voice pack.
October 28, 2021: Halloween Masquerade, aka. Version 2.3 & the mid-update of Interdimensional Super Mayhem. Features Pumpkin Pie Cookie & Costumes, which are cosmetic & can activate buffs on certain sets.
November 18 - December 9, 2021: The Frost Witch & the Lantern in the Snow, aka Version 2.4 - 2.5. Features 3 new cookies (Cotton, Cocoa, & Frost Queen), a special storyline, items that skip certain levels & more new costumes.
 January 19, 2022: The War Under Shattered Skies, aka. Version 2.6. Features 2 new cookies (Eclair & Tea Knight), expanded Guild potential, a continuation of the Light the Beacons storyline & a new game mode. This ends the Second Cookie Legion. On February 17, 2022, Devsisters announced that due to political reasons, the game will end its support for Vietnamese players.
 February 24, 2022: Heroes of the Dark Cacao Kingdom, aka. Version 2.7. Features 2 new cookies (Affogato, Dark Cacao), a new Episode featuring the Dark Cacao Kingdom & a mid-update (Version 2.8) featuring one more cookie (Caramel Arrow) & Episodes 13 and 14. A mid-update (Version 2.9) was released in April featuring Cherry Blossom Cookie
 May 3, 2022: Ch. I: The Council of Heroes, aka. Version 3.0, Features 2 new Cookies (Clotted Cream, Wildberry), a new game mode called Cookie Odyssey, Titles, a new Grandmaster Arena tier, and added new languages and voices (Thai, Taiwanese, German, French) A mid-update (Version 3.1) was released in the 27th of May features Crunchy Chip Cookie, Hall of Ancient Heroes introduced and the Statue of Heroic Radiance, Super Mayhem (Paladin's Oath) returned for a limited time.
 June 14, 2022: Ch 2: The Glorious Creme Republic, or Version 3.2. Includes the next chapter of the Cookie Odyssey mode, new decor and costumes, and a new Super Epic cookie, Oyster Cookie.,
 July 7, 2022: Ch 3: Heroes of the Light, or Version 3.3. Includes the third and final chapter of Cookie Odyssey, and introduces Ascension, Magic Candies, the Magic Laboratory, Master Mode, and the Sky Garden.
 July 28, 2022: Disney Crossover: Festival of Dreams and Wishes, or Version 3.4, Features a new crossover event with Disney, 20 new characters added (unavailable to be used in activities (battles, workshops, etc.), 1 cookie (Cream Unicorn Cookie), a new rarity tier (Guest), new decors and new cookie castle design, added Disney Gacha. A mid-update (Version 3.5) released on August 11, 2022, added 2 new Magic Candy for Rye Cookie and Milk Cookie, added 2 new Treasures, a renewal of Guild Battle, and added 2 new bosses in the game mode, Avatar of Destiny, Living Abyss.
 September 6, 2022: Legend of the Duskgloom Sea, or Version 3.6, Features 2 new cookies (1 Epic & 1 Legendary), Captain Caviar Cookie, and Black Pearl Cookie, & a limited-time game mode called Black Pearl Islands. A mid-update (Version 3.7) released on September 27, 2022, releases a new Epic cookie (Candy Diver Cookie) and a new Magic Candy for Squid Ink Cookie.
 October 13, 2022: BTS Crossover: Braver Together, or Version 3.8. Features a new crossover event with BTS, 8 new cookies added (7 Special, all based on the BTS members, and the first Epic non-cookie Schwarzwälder), new decors, a crossover-exclusive gacha, an exclusive game mode that involves a rhythm minigame, and 3 new supported languages (Spanish, Portuguese, & Indonesian). This is to note Devsisters' involvement on sponsoring BTS' concert for the World Expo 2030 Busan.
 November 30, 2022: Stories by the Fireplace, aka. Version 3.10. Features 1 Epic and 1 Super Epic (Carol Cookie and Sherbet Cookie), a special storyline featuring Frost Queen Cookie and other Legendary Cookies, introduces a new treasure, new Frost debuff, buffs for Frost Queen Cookie and Snow Sugar Cookie,  Tower of Sweet Chaos tray jumping, Improved Freeze, Unlock conditions for unlocked Titles are now viewable, the Holiday Cake Shop and Cookie Holidays stories. A mid-update (Version 3.11) was released in December featuring Pinecone Cookie.
 January 5, 2023: New Year, New Adventures, aka. Version 3.12. Features a new Epic, Prophet Cookie, 6 new Decors for Lunar New Year theme, introduces Prophet Cookie's Shiny Fortune Gacha, Collect Shiny Fortunes, New Year's Crunchy Fortunes, and the rerun of Lucky Tickets.
 January 19, 2023: Invitation from the Slumbering Moon, aka. Version 4.0. Features 1 Epic and 1 Legendary (Milky Way Cookie and Moonlight Cookie), new Sleep and Drowsiness debuffs, a new treasure, buffs for Ancient Cookies, new Episode 15, Crunchy Dreams, Might of the Ancients, Resonant Toppings, 12 new Costumes, 12 new Cookie Interactions, and a new event, Woof! Cake Hound Frenzy. A mid-update, The Fateful Moonrise (4.1) released on February 14, introduces 1 Epic (Blueberry Pie), Episode 16, a continuation of Crunchy Dreams, new Magic Candy for Cream Puff, new Master Mode variant for Episode 5, Cookies level cap increased from 70 to 75, 20 new Decors for Starry Dream Station theme, Kingdom Music Hall, Arena Statue Showcase, and a new event, What's this?! Sweet & Lovely Choco Box.

Reception 
The game had gained massive popularity after the wake of Genshin Impact anniversary controversy.

On the iOS platform, Cookie Run: Kingdom has a Ratings and Reviews rating of 4.5 out of 5 and has a total of 9.6k reviews. This game is rated 164th in the App store in the Role-Playing category.

On the Android platform, Cookie Run: Kingdom has a Ratings and Reviews score of 4.4 out of 5 and has a total of 579k reviews. This game has been downloaded 5 million times in Thailand. 

In addition to the information on the App Store and Google Play, a summary of Cookie Run: Kingdom information is included. Cookie Run: Kingdom is Ranked 31st in Free Role-Playing game category in Thailand. In terms of free games, Japan ranked 1st on the Apple App Store and Google Play, and 3rd in the Free Role-Playing game category in United States. It was also ranked 1st in South Korea, 2nd in Taiwan, 3rd in Thailand, and 5th in Hong Kong in the Free Game on Apple App Store category in January 2021. In South Korea, Taiwan and Thailand, the game revenue is ranked 1st on the Apple App Store, and in Hong Kong and Singapore, it is ranked 3rd in January 2021. Cookie Run: Kingdom had 10 million downloads in the first two months after its release and has been downloaded over 150 million times as of June 2021.

References

External links 
Developer Official Website
Official Website

Role-playing games introduced in 2021
Video game spin-offs
Video games about food and drink
Gacha games
Video games developed in South Korea